The World Hockey Association General Player Draft was held over the course of two days, February 12 and February 13, 1972, in Anaheim, California. The purpose of the draft was to establish an orderly process through which WHA teams would stock their rosters by the beginning of their inaugural season later that year. As such, players from other professional teams (notably National Hockey League clubs) were eligible to be drafted. The draftees were not under any legal obligation to sign with the drafting WHA club: other WHA clubs were prevented from negotiating with the players who had been drafted.

The draft was held in two parts: a "Preliminary" round in which teams made so-called "priority" selections, and the rounds of the "General Draft" which followed. For the preliminary round, each team wrote four names on a piece of paper, which were then submitted and announced prior to the start of the General Draft. The priority selections were the most sought after players, consisting mostly of NHL veterans and highly touted prospects.

Twelve teams took part in the draft: the Calgary Broncos, Chicago Cougars, Dayton Aeros, Edmonton Oil Kings, Los Angeles Sharks, Miami Screaming Eagles, Minnesota Fighting Saints, New England Whalers, Winnipeg Jets, and three then-unnamed franchises based in New York (later the Raiders), Ontario (later the Ottawa Nationals) and Quebec City (later the Nordiques).

The Broncos folded within months, before the beginning of the season, and the negotiating rights to their picks were transferred to a new club: the Cleveland Crusaders. Similarly the Screaming Eagles never took to the ice, and their picks transferred to the Philadelphia Blazers. The Dayton Aeros moved to Houston before the playing season, and the Oil Kings changed their name to Alberta Oilers with the intent of splitting home games between Edmonton and Calgary.

Preliminary round

Calgary Broncos

Chicago Cougars

Dayton Aeros

Edmonton Oil Kings

Los Angeles Sharks

Miami Screaming Eagles

Minnesota Fighting Saints

New England Whalers

New York

Ontario

Quebec City

Winnipeg Jets

Regular rounds

Calgary Broncos

Rounds 1–10

Rounds 11–20

Rounds 21–50

Rounds 51–70

Rounds 71+

Chicago Cougars

Dayton Aeros

Edmonton Oil Kings

Los Angeles Sharks

Miami Screaming Eagles

Minnesota Fighting Saints

New England Whalers

New York

Ontario

Quebec City

Winnipeg Jets

Footnotes

References
 

Draft